Glyphus is a genus of shrimp from the family Pasiphaeidae, first described by Henri Filhol in 1884. The type species is Glyphus marsupialis, by monotypy.

In La vie au fonds des mers, Filhol describes it as being found at depths of 882 m between the Canaries and Cap Vert.

References

Decapods
Caridea
Decapod genera
Taxa named by Henri Filhol
Crustaceans described in 1884